The United States has the world's second largest exclusive economic zone, behind France. The total size is 2. Areas of its EEZ are located in three oceans, the Gulf of Mexico, and the Caribbean Sea. Most notable areas are Alaska, Hawaii, the East Coast, West Coast and Gulf Coast of the United States.

Geography

The EEZ borders with Russia to the north west, Canada to the north, Cuba, Bahamas, Mexico to the south, Dominican Republic, British Virgin Islands, Anguilla to the south east and Samoa, Niue to the south west. The unincorporated territories of Guam, Puerto Rico, U.S. Virgin Islands and Northern Mariana Islands are included.

Disputes

Active

Canada
A wedge-shaped section of the Beaufort Sea is disputed between Canada and the United States, because the area reportedly contains substantial oil reserves.

See also 
Magnuson–Stevens Fishery Conservation and Management Act
Geography of the United States
Exclusive economic zone of Canada
Exclusive economic zone of Mexico

References

United States
Borders of the United States
Economy of the United States
Territorial disputes of the United States
Canada–United States relations
Mexico–United States relations